Ganarew (from Welsh: Genau'r Rhiw;  'Gana-rhiw', and 'Gan y rew') is a village and small civil parish in south Herefordshire, England near the River Wye and the border with Wales. It contains the Church of St Swithin and Ganarew Manor.

History
The name Gana-rhiw, now Ganarew, may derive from the Briton "Gan", from genau, meaning "a mouth or opening of a pass"; "Rhiw" is the Welsh word for "hill".

Legend 
King Vortigern is said to have made his last stand against Aurelius at Ganarew. Lawman calls it a castle on Cloard Hill in the district of Hergin, and has Vortigern dying after the castle was besieged and fired by Aurelius and Uther.

A cave, at nearby Little Doward, known as "King Arthur's Cave" can be explored, making it unique amongst candidates for the Arthurian cave legend. Helen Hill Miller in her 1969 The Realms of Arthur, suggests a military use for the cave, arguing that the cave's "recesses penetrate very far into the hill, and could hide a substantial force". The cave has a parallel with Cadbury Castle in that it is a cave within a hillfort. It was first inhabited in the Old Stone Age and is thus older than any other Arthurian site.

Geography
Ganarew is located in the far south of Herefordshire, just across the border from Wales. The River Wye flows to the southeast of the village. Little Doward and Great Doward lie to the east. Woods in the area include Sanger Wood, Millennium Wood, Hazel Wood and Goldsmith's Wood to the south.

Notable landmarks

Church of St Swithin
The parish church, which is within the Church of England Diocese of Hereford, is dedicated to St Swithin. A Grade II listed building, it was rebuilt in about 1850 by John Prichard. The graveyard contains a Gothic pinnacle memorial to the Bannerman family who lived nearby at Wyastone Leys.

Ganarew Manor

The manor dates from the 17th century, with mid 19th and early 20th century alterations. The house is of stone with a slate roof, the 20th century extensions including a two-storey block with a bay window and a gabled porch. The manor is the home of Sir Colin Sheperd, former Member of Parliament for Hereford and is a Grade II listed building. The gate to the manor, with accompanying piers, is also a Grade II listed structure.

Ancient monuments
The Church of St Swithin churchyard contains a standing stone cross, of stepped form, which is a scheduled historical monument. It is principally medieval with some later additions and includes the foundation, the base of two steps and a socket stone. The shaft, knop and head are modern.

Other ancient monuments are noted by English Heritage at Ganarew Cross, and at Little Doward camp, the remains of an Iron Age hillfort. The Wye Valley Walk passes close to the south of the camp.

Transport
In 1755 a road was constructed from Monnow Bridge to Gan y rew. In the late 18th century, the turnpike route to Ross in the area of Ganarew Hill was described as being in such bad condition that it was a travel danger. The Hereford Trust took over road work for the section between Old Forge and Ganarew in 1819. Plans in the early 19th century to build a connecting road between St. Weonards and Ganarew were not carried out.

References

External links 
Extract from National Gazetteer, 1868
Photos of Ganarew and surrounding area on geograph

Locations associated with Arthurian legend
Villages in Herefordshire